Elizabeth Field may refer to:

 Elizabeth Field (Suffolk County, New York), an airport located on Fishers Island, Suffolk County, New York
 Elizabeth Field (author) (1804–1890), English-born Canadian writer and artist
 Elizabeth H. Field, academic scholar and professor
 Elizabeth Eleanor Field, British chemist

Field, Elizabeth